Faisal Al-Merqeb (born 1981) is a Saudi Arabian footballer who currently plays as a goalkeeper.

External links
Saudi League Profile

1981 births
Living people
Saudi Arabian footballers
Ittihad FC players
Sdoos Club players
Al-Watani Club players
Al-Riyadh SC players
Al-Wehda Club (Mecca) players
Al-Taawoun FC players
Al-Nahda Club (Saudi Arabia) players
Al-Diriyah Club players
Al-Arabi SC (Saudi Arabia) players
Saudi First Division League players
Saudi Professional League players
Saudi Second Division players
Association football goalkeepers